Events from the year 2005 in Nepal.

Incumbents
Monarch : King Gyanendra
Prime Minister: Sher Bahadur Deuba (until 1 February)
Chief Justice:  
 Until 13 January: Govinda Bahadur Shrestha
 14 January - 29 July: Hari Prasad Sharma
 Starting 31 July: Dilip Kumar Poudel

Events
 February 1 - King Gyanendra dismisses the government of Sher Bahadur Deuba and assumes direct authority.
 April 7 - Maoists attack on a Royal Nepal Army base in Khara, Rukum fails, leading to death of at least 166 insurgents.
 July 6 - Maoists bomb a civilian bus in Bandarmude, Chitwan killing 38 and injuring around 75.
 August 30 - September 2 - 11th General Convention of Nepali Congress.

References

 
21st century in Nepal
2000s in Nepal
Years of the 21st century in Nepal
Nepal